Hong Kong competed at the 2020 Summer Olympics in Tokyo, Japan, marking the territory's seventeenth appearance at the Summer Olympics since its debut as a British colony in 1952. More medals were won at the 2020 Summer Olympics by athletes representing Hong Kong than ever before, and Hong Kong also won its first gold medal since the handover back to China.

Medalists

Competitors
The following list specifies the number of competitors for Hong Kong in each sport.

Athletics

Hong Kong received a male universality slot from IAAF to send one athlete to the Olympics, while one female athlete qualified by world ranking.

Track & road events

Badminton

Hong Kong entered four badminton players for each of the following events into the Olympic tournament based on the BWF World Race to Tokyo Rankings: one entry each in the men's and women's singles and a pair in the mixed doubles.

Cycling

Road
Hong Kong received a spare berth freed up by host nation Japan to send one rider to the men's Olympic road race, as the highest-ranked nation for men, not yet qualified, in the UCI World Ranking.

Track
Following the completion of the 2020 UCI Track Cycling World Championships, Hong Kong riders obtained spots in the women's omnium and women's madison, as well as the women's sprint and keirin, based on their country's results in the final UCI Olympic rankings.

Sprint

Keirin

Omnium

Madison

Equestrian

Hong Kong entered one eventing rider into the Olympic equestrian competition for the first time in 12 years and finished in the top two, outside the group selection, of the individual FEI Olympic Rankings for Group G (Southeast Asia and Oceania).

Eventing

Fencing

For the first time since Seoul 1988, Hong Kong fencers entered a full squad in the men's team foil and women's team épée as the highest-ranked nation from Asia outside the world's top four in the FIE Olympic Team Rankings.

Golf

Hong Kong entered one female golfer into the Olympic tournament. Tiffany Chan qualified directly among the top 60 eligible players for the women's event based on the IGF World Rankings of 29 June 2021.

Gymnastics

Artistic
Hong Kong entered one artistic gymnast into the Olympic competition, London 2012 Olympian Shek Wai Hung who secured one of the three spots available for individual-based gymnasts but did not qualify for the team, the all-around, or the vault exercise at the 2019 World Championships in Stuttgart, Germany.

Men

Karate

Hong Kong entered one karateka into the inaugural Olympic tournament. 2018 world bronze medalist Grace Lau qualified directly for the women's kata category by finishing among the top four karatekas at the end of the combined WKF Olympic Rankings.

Rowing

Hong Kong qualified one boat in the women's single sculls for the Games by finishing first in the B-final and securing the fourth of five berths available at the 2021 FISA Asia & Oceania Olympic Qualification Regatta in Tokyo, Japan.

Qualification Legend: FA=Final A (medal); FB=Final B (non-medal); FC=Final C (non-medal); FD=Final D (non-medal); FE=Final E (non-medal); FF=Final F (non-medal); SA/B=Semifinals A/B; SC/D=Semifinals C/D; SE/F=Semifinals E/F; QF=Quarterfinals; R=Repechage

Sailing

Hong Kong sailors qualified for one boat in each of the following classes through the class-associated World Championships and the continental regattas.

M = Medal race; EL = Eliminated – did not advance into the medal race; † – Discarded race not counted in the overall result

Swimming

Hong Kong swimmers further achieved qualifying standards in the following events (up to a maximum of 2 swimmers in each event at the Olympic Qualifying Time (OQT), and potentially 1 at the Olympic Selection Time (OST)):

Men

Women

Table tennis

Hong Kong entered six athletes into the table tennis competition at the Games, with an additional two alternate athletes for the team tournaments. The men's and women's teams secured one of nine available places, respectively, at the 2020 World Olympic Qualification Event in Gondomar, Portugal, permitting a maximum of two starters to compete in each of the men's and women's singles tournament. Moreover, an additional berth was awarded to the Hong Kong table tennis players competing in the inaugural mixed doubles by advancing to the semifinal stage of the 2019 ITTF World Tour Grand Finals in Zhengzhou, China.

Men

Women

Mixed

Triathlon

Hong Kong entered one triathlete to compete at the Games for the first time since the 2008. British-born Oscar Coggins secured a place in the men's event by topping the list of individual triathletes from Asia and Oceania vying for qualification based on the ITU World Rankings.

References

Nations at the 2020 Summer Olympics
2020
2021 in Hong Kong sport